Gigi Gryce and the Jazz Lab Quintet is an album by American jazz saxophonist Gigi Gryce, recorded in 1957 for the Riverside label.

Reception

AllMusic awarded the album 4½ stars, stating: "This is exciting and still fresh-sounding bebop."

Track listing
All compositions by Gigi Gryce except as indicated
 "Love for Sale" (Cole Porter) – 7:59  
 "Geraldine" (Wade Legge) – 5:34  
 "Minority" – 6:26  
 "Zing! Went the Strings of My Heart" (James F. Hanley) – 5:59  
 "Straight Ahead" (Gryce as "Lee Sears") – 9:29  
 "Wake Up!" – 4:37  
Recorded at Reeves Sound Studios in New York City on February 27, 1957 (tracks 1–3) and March 7, 1957 (tracks 4–6)

Personnel 
Gigi Gryce – alto saxophone 
Donald Byrd – trumpet  
Wade Legge – piano
Wendell Marshall – bass
Art Taylor – drums

References 

1957 albums
Gigi Gryce albums
Albums produced by Orrin Keepnews
Riverside Records albums